Gasore Hategeka (born 1 March 1987) is a Rwandan cyclist, who last rode for UCI Continental team . He is a former national road race champion of Rwanda.

Major results

2010
 1st Stage 3 Tour du Cameroun
 2nd Road race, National Road Championships
2011
 7th Overall Tour du Cameroun
1st Stage 3
 8th Overall Kwita Izina Cycling Tour
 10th Overall Tour of Rwanda
2012
 10th Overall Kwita Izina Cycling Tour
2013
 1st  Road race, National Road Championships
2015
 4th Overall Grand Prix Chantal Biya
2016
 1st Stage 3 Tour de Côte d'Ivoire
2017
 1st  Road race, National Road Championships
2018
 3rd Road race, National Road Championships

References

External links

1987 births
Living people
Rwandan male cyclists